Diego Sarmiento de Valladares (1615 – 29 January 1695) was a Spanish bishop who was Grand Inquisitor of Spain from 1669 to 1695.

Biography

Diego Sarmiento de Valladares was born in Vigo in 1615, the son of Luis Sarmiento, señor de Valladares and Inés de Arines Romay, señora de Camos. He was closely related to Jose Sarmiento de Valladares y Arines Romay, 1st Duke of Atrisco and Viceroy of New Spain.

Valladares was ordained as a priest on 4 October 1667.  He was appointed Bishop of Oviedo on 30 January 1668.  He was translated on 17 September 1668, becoming Bishop of Plasencia.  Charles II of Spain also named him president of the Council of Castile at this time, and he held that post until 1669.  In 1669, he became Grand Inquisitor of Spain.  He resigned his bishopric on 26 April 1677 but remained Grand Inquisitor until his death.  In this capacity, he oversaw one of the Spanish Inquisition's largest auto-da-fés of the seventeenth century, held in the Plaza Mayor, Madrid in 1680.

Valladares died in Madrid on 29 January 1695.

References
This page is based on this page on Spanish Wikipedia

External links and additional sources
 (for Chronology of Bishops)  
 (for Chronology of Bishops) 

1615 births
1695 deaths
Grand Inquisitors of Spain
Bishops of Oviedo
17th-century Roman Catholic bishops in Spain